Nathaniel Uring was an English merchant who traveled to Africa and the Americas in the early eighteenth century. His 1725 and 1726 accounts are important sources for the history of early colonial Saint Vincent, Saint Lucia, and Belize, as well as the Kingdom of Loango, among other subjects.

By letters patent of 22 June 1722 George I of Great Britain granted John Montagu, 2nd Duke of Montagu the islands of St. Lucia and St. Vincent's in the West Indies, and appointed him governor and captain-general thereof. Montagu appointed Uring deputy-governor, and sent him out with seven ships containing settlers and their families. The British men-of-war on the station would not directly support the enterprise, and when the French landed a body of troops from Martinique to oppose him, Uring was compelled to conclude a treaty agreeing to quit St. Lucia within seven days. A similar attempt to obtain a footing in St. Vincent's was opposed by the inhabitants, and also ended in failure, Montagu is said to have lost 40,000 pounds over the undertaking.

Works

See also
List of colonial governors and administrators of Saint Lucia

References 

English merchants
18th-century English people
Governors of British Saint Lucia